Gangs of London is a British television series produced by Pulse Films & Sister, following struggles between rival gangs and other criminal organisations in present-day London. The first series aired in the UK on 23 April 2020 on Sky Atlantic. Loosely based on the 2006 video game of the same name, the series was created by Gareth Evans and Matt Flannery, best known for The Raid action crime films. A second series was announced in June 2020, with AMC to take over US broadcast rights and co-produce. The second series premiered on 20 October 2022 in the UK and Germany and premiered on 17 November 2022 in the US. A third series was announced in November 2022.

Premise
London, one of the world's most dynamic and multicultural cities, is being torn apart by the turbulent power struggles of the international gangs that control it and the sudden power vacuum that's created when the head of London's most powerful crime family is assassinated.

For 20 years, Finn Wallace (Colm Meaney) was the most powerful criminal in London. Billions of pounds flowed through his organisation each year. But now he's dead, and nobody knows who ordered him killed. With rivals everywhere, it's up to the impulsive Sean Wallace (Joe Cole), with the help of the Dumani family headed by Ed Dumani (Lucian Msamati), to take his father's place. If the situation wasn't already dangerous enough, Sean's assumption of power causes ripples in the world of international crime within the streets of London, which consists of the Albanian Mafia headed by Luan Dushaj, as well as the Kurdish freedom fighters, Pakistani Drug Cartel, Welsh travellers and various other criminal elements.

In the middle of this is newcomer Elliot Finch (Sope Dirisu), an undercover policeman who has infiltrated the Wallace family organisation.

Cast and characters

Main
 Joe Cole as Sean Wallace, the younger son of Finn Wallace, who fights for leadership of his family's criminal empire after his father's death.
 Thomas Simpson portrays Sean as a teenager during flashbacks. 
 Colm Meaney as Finn Wallace (series 1), the late patriarch of the Wallace family and leader of a criminal empire whose murder throws the London underworld into chaos.
 Lucian Msamati as Edward "Ed" Dumani, the patriarch of the Dumani family and Finn Wallace's longtime right-hand man.
 Sope Dirisu as Elliot Carter / Finch, an undercover police officer who infiltrates the ranks of the Wallace Organisation and begins a relationship with Shannon Dumani.
 Ejiro Ndi-Efam portrays Elliot as a child during flashbacks.
 Michelle Fairley as Marian Wallace, the ruthless matriarch of the Wallace family and mother to Billy and Sean Wallace, and Jacqueline Robinson.
 Brian Vernel as Billy Wallace, the older son of Finn Wallace who is suffering from substance abuse.
 Pete MacHale portrays Billy as a teenager during flashbacks.
 Valene Kane as Jacqueline Robinson (series 1–2), the daughter of Finn Wallace and a doctor who is estranged from her family for the safety of her unborn child.
 Paapa Essiedu as Alexander "Alex" Dumani (series 1–2), the son of Ed Dumani and a close associate of Sean Wallace, who many believe should inherit the Wallace criminal empire.
 Pippa Bennett-Warner as Shannon Dumani, the daughter of Ed Dumani, who begins a relationship with Elliot Finch.
 Asif Raza Mir as Asif Afridi, the drug kingpin of the Pakistani drug cartel.
 Orli Shuka as Luan Dushaj, the leader of the Albanian mafia in London, who is brought into the Wallace family's disputes when Finn Wallace is murdered on his territory.
 Narges Rashidi as Lale, the leader of the Kurdish PKK fighters in London who oversees a heroin distribution ring whilst seeking revenge against Asif Afridi.
 Mark Lewis Jones as Kinney Edwards (series 1), the leader of a group of Welsh travellers who become involved in the murder of Finn Wallace.
 Ray Panthaki as Jevan Kapadia (series 1), the point of contact for the mysterious Investors, who wish to tip the scales of the future of the Wallace Organisation.
 Jing Lusi as Victoria "Vicky" Chung (series 1), a detective inspector in the London Metropolitan Police and Elliot Carter's handler.
 Waleed Zuaiter as Koba (series 2), the ruthless leader of the Georgian mafia and an international arms dealer who is brought to London by the Investors to bring order to the city.
 Jahz Armando as Saba (series 2), Basem's niece who works at a cafe that is a front for the Algerian mafia.
 Fady Elsayed as Faz (series 2), Basem's nephew and a young member of the Algerian mafia who becomes traumatized after a run-in with Koba.
 Salem Kali as Basem Soudani (series 2), the leader of the Algerian mafia who wants to free his gang from the Investors' control.
 Aymen Hamdouchi as Hakim (series 2), Basem's right-hand man in the Algerian mafia.

Recurring
 Parth Thakerar as Nasir Afridi (series 1), Asif Afridi's son and a candidate for Mayor of London.
 Taye Matthew as Danny Dumani, Shannon Dumani's young son.
 Aksel Ustun as Hekar (series 1), Lale's right-hand man and one of the Kurdish PKK fighters.
 Adrian Bower as Mark (series 1), an enforcer for the Wallace family who dislikes Elliot Finch.
 Jude Akuwudike as Charlie Carter (series 1–2), Elliot Carter's father and a retired boxer.
 Adam J. Bernard portrays a younger Charlie during flashbacks.
 Nebli Basani as Tariq Gjelaj (series 1), Luan Dushaj's right-hand man in the Albanian mafia.
 Garry Cooper as John Harks (series 1), a detective chief inspector in the London Metropolitan Police and Vicky Chung's colleague.
 Pamela Nomvete as Serwa (series 1; guest series 2), a private investigator hired by Marian Wallace.
 Richard Pepple as Uche "Mosi" Mossanya (series 1), the leader of the Nigerian mafia, who strikes a deal with Luan Dushaj to launder their money through the Wallace Organisation.
 Mads Koudal as Leif Hansen (series 1), a Danish assassin hired by Jevan Kapadia to kill various targets.
 Arta Dobroshi as Floriana (series 1; guest series 2), Finn Wallace's Albanian mistress who is carrying his unborn child.
 David Avery as Anthony (series 1), a police officer who infiltrates the Wallace Organisation after Elliot Carter's relationship with Shannon Dumani is revealed.
 Sharon Morgan as Ingrid Hansen (series 1), Leif Hansen's elderly mother.
 Eri Shuka as Mirlinda Dushaj, Luan Dushaj's wife and the mother of his young daughters.
 Amanda Drew as Ms. Kane (series 2; guest series 1), one of the Investors and Jevan Kapadia's enigmatic superior.
 Cornell John as Joseph Singer (series 2; guest series 1), a mysterious man who has spent years attempting to take down the Investors.
 Rom Blanco as Tamaz (series 2), Koba's right-hand man in the Georgian mafia.
 Andi Jashy as Afrim (series 2), an enforcer for the Albanian mafia.
 Murat Erkek as Merwan (series 2), the new second-in-command and public face of the Kurdish PKK fighters in London.

Guest
 Emmett J. Scanlan as Jack O'Doherty (series 1), Finn Wallace's personal driver.
 Richard Harrington as Mal (series 1), a Welsh traveller and Kinney Edwards's right-hand man.
 Aled ap Steffan as Darren Edwards (series 1), Kinney Edward's son, who is unknowingly hired to murder Finn Wallace.
 Darren Evans as Ioan (series 1), Darren Edwards's friend and an accomplice in Finn Wallace's murder.
 Caroline Lee-Johnson as Evie (series 1), a weapons manufacturer who employs teenage orphans as her staff.
 David Bradley as Jim (series 1), a retired enforcer for the Wallace Organisation and Elliot's former boss.
 Gordon Alexander as Cole (series 1), a sadistic hitman hired by Sean Wallace.
 Laura Bach as Tove Fransen (series 1), Leif Hansen's partner and second-in-command.
 Azra Rexhepi as Elira Dushaj, Luan and Murlinda Dushaj's elder daughter.
 Chloe Sulaj as Bukoroshe Dushaj, Luan and Murlinda Dushaj's younger daughter.
 Tim McInnerny as Jacob (series 1), Kane's partner and one of the Investors.
 Ronan Raftery as Darragh (series 2), the younger Irish mercenary working for Marian Wallace.
 Louis Dempsey as Killian (series 2), the older Irish mercenary working for Marian Wallace.
 Tamar Baruch as Bibi Agostini (series 2), the French drug queenpin of Paris.

Production 
During filming production visited  St Clere Estate in Kent to stage a Traveller site and Dartford to film a speed boat scene near Queen Elizabeth II Bridge. A driving scene was also featured on Pilgrim's Way. The show was confirmed for a second series premiering in 2022. In July 2021, production on the second series had been halted for 10 days following a crew member testing positive for COVID-19. Filming for the second series began on 31 May 2021 and wrapped in February 2022. The second series premiered on 20th October 2022.

Release 
The first season of the series was co-produced with American pay network Cinemax which was expected to air the programme alongside Sky. However, following an announcement in January 2020 by executives with parent company WarnerMedia that they would be winding down Cinemax's original programming, its producers began negotiating to move the series to another U.S. outlet, with Cinemax's blessing. AMC took over distribution, which started on October 1, 2020 through the AMC+ platform.

Episodes

Series 1 (2020)

Series 2 (2022)

Reception
On review aggregator Rotten Tomatoes, the series holds an approval rating of 91% based on 33 reviews. The website's critics consensus reads, "A modern crime family masterpiece, Gangs of London builds its own empire atop tried and true mafia turf -- complete with engaging drama, exhilarating action, and fine performances all around" GQ said it is "a strong early contender to be the best show of the summer."

The series became Sky Atlantic's second-biggest original drama launch of all time, with a 7-day cumulative audience of 2.23 million viewers for the opening episode.

References

External links 
 

2020 British television series debuts
2020s British crime drama television series
British action television series
Cinemax original programming
English-language television shows
Serial drama television series
Sky Atlantic original programming
Television shows set in London
Live action television shows based on video games